In nine-dimensional geometry, a rectified 9-cube is a convex uniform 9-polytope, being a rectification of the regular 9-cube.

There are 9 rectifications of the 9-cube. The zeroth is the 9-cube itself, and the 8th is the dual 9-orthoplex. Vertices of the rectified 9-cube are located at the edge-centers of the 9-orthoplex. Vertices of the birectified 9-cube are located in the square face centers of the 9-cube. Vertices of the trirectified 9-orthoplex are located in the cube cell centers of the 9-cube. Vertices of the quadrirectified 9-cube are located in the tesseract centers of the 9-cube.

These polytopes are part of a family 511 uniform 9-polytopes with BC9 symmetry.

Rectified 9-cube

Alternate names
 Rectified enneract (Acronym ren) (Jonathan Bowers)

Images

Birectified 9-cube

Alternate names
 Birectified enneract (Acronym barn) (Jonathan Bowers)

Images

Trirectified 9-cube

Alternate names
 Trirectified enneract (Acronym tarn) (Jonathan Bowers)

Images

Quadrirectified 9-cube

Alternate names
 Quadrirectified enneract (Acronym nav) (Jonathan Bowers)

Images

Notes

References
 H.S.M. Coxeter: 
 H.S.M. Coxeter, Regular Polytopes, 3rd Edition, Dover New York, 1973 
 Kaleidoscopes: Selected Writings of H.S.M. Coxeter, edited by F. Arthur Sherk, Peter McMullen, Anthony C. Thompson, Asia Ivic Weiss, Wiley-Interscience Publication, 1995,  
 (Paper 22) H.S.M. Coxeter, Regular and Semi Regular Polytopes I, [Math. Zeit. 46 (1940) 380-407, MR 2,10]
 (Paper 23) H.S.M. Coxeter, Regular and Semi-Regular Polytopes II, [Math. Zeit. 188 (1985) 559-591]
 (Paper 24) H.S.M. Coxeter, Regular and Semi-Regular Polytopes III, [Math. Zeit. 200 (1988) 3-45]
 Norman Johnson Uniform Polytopes, Manuscript (1991)
 N.W. Johnson: The Theory of Uniform Polytopes and Honeycombs, Ph.D. (1966)
  x3o3o3o3o3o3o3o4o - vee, o3x3o3o3o3o3o3o4o - riv, o3o3x3o3o3o3o3o4o - brav, o3o3o3x3o3o3o3o4o - tarv, o3o3o3o3x3o3o3o4o - nav, o3o3o3o3o3x3o3o4o - tarn, o3o3o3o3o3o3x3o4o - barn, o3o3o3o3o3o3o3x4o - ren, o3o3o3o3o3o3o3o4x - enne

External links 
 Polytopes of Various Dimensions
 Multi-dimensional Glossary

9-polytopes